The following is a list of stadiums in Singapore.

Public stadiums 
These stadiums are run by the Sport Singapore.

Demolished stadiums

Future Stadiums

These stadiums are managed by government or government-aided schools. Some may be used by the public either by booking through the SSC or on a "Free to Play" sharing basis where walk-ins without bookings are permitted.

These stadiums are managed by government ministries.

Private stadiums

ITE College Central Stadium
ITE College East Stadium
ITE College West Stadium
Nanyang Polytechnic Stadium
Nanyang Technological University Stadium
National University of Singapore Stadium
Ngee Ann Polytechnic Stadium
Republic Polytechnic Stadium
Singapore Polytechnic Stadium
Singapore Sports School Stadium
Singapore University of Technology and Design Stadium
Temasek Polytechnic Stadium

References

External links
Information on Stadiums — Singapore Sports Council official website

Sports venues in Singapore
Singapore
Stadiums
Stadiums
Singapore